Malaya Kondratovskaya is a rural locality (a village) in Kargopolsky District, Arkhangelsk Oblast, Russia. The population was 4 as of 2012.

Geography 
Malaya Kondratovskaya is located 14 km south of Kargopol (the district's administrative centre) by road. Yeremeyevskaya is the nearest rural locality.

References 

Rural localities in Kargopolsky District